The 1949 All-Ireland Senior Hurling Championship was the 63rd staging of the All-Ireland hurling championship since its establishment by the Gaelic Athletic Association in 1887. The championship began on 15 May 1949 and ended on 4 September 1949.

Waterford were the defending champions, however, they were defeated in the provincial championship. Tipperary won the title following a 3-11 to 0-3 defeat of Laois.

Teams

Team summaries

Results

Leinster Senior Hurling Championship

Semi-finals

Final

Munster Senior Hurling Championship

First round

Semi-finals

Final

All-Ireland Senior Hurling Championship

Semi-finals

Final

Championship statistics

Top scorers

Overall

In a single game

Scoring

Widest winning margin: 29 points 
Tipperary 6-18 - 1-4 Antrim (All-Ireland semi-final, 31 July 1949)
Most goals in a match: 11 
Offaly 4-2 - 7-5 Laois (Leinster quarter-final , 15 May 1949)
Most points in a match: 26 
Tipperary 1-16 - 2-10 Limerick (Munster final, 17 July 1949)
Most goals by one team in a match: 7 
Laois 7-5 - 4-2 Offaly (Leinster quarter-final , 15 May 1949)
Most goals scored by a losing team: 4 
Offaly 4-2 - 7-5 Laois (Leinster quarter-final , 15 May 1949)
Most points scored by a losing team: 10 
Limerick 2-10 - 1-16 Tipperary (Munster final, 17 July 1949)

Miscellaneous
 Laois win the Leinster championship for the first time since 1915.
 The All-Ireland final meeting of Laois and Tipperary is their first ever championship meeting.

Sources
 Corry, Eoghan, The GAA Book of Lists (Hodder Headline Ireland, 2005).
 Donegan, Des, The Complete Handbook of Gaelic Games (DBA Publications Limited, 2005).
 Sweeney, Éamonn, Munster Hurling Legends (The O'Brien Press, 2002).

External links
 1949 All-Ireland Hurling Championship results

References

1949